The 2021 WTA Lyon Open (also known as the Open 6ème Sens — Métropole de Lyon for sponsorship reasons) is a women's tennis tournament played on indoor hard courts. It is the second edition of the Lyon Open (WTA) and an International tournament on the 2021 WTA Tour. It will take place at the Halle Tony Garnier in Lyon, France, from 1 to 7 March 2021.

Champions

Singles 

  Clara Tauson def.  Viktorija Golubic 6–4, 6–1.
This was Tauson's first WTA singles title.

Doubles 

  Viktória Kužmová /  Arantxa Rus def.  Eugenie Bouchard /  Olga Danilović 3–6, 7–5, [10–7].

Points and prize money

Point distribution

Prize money

1Qualifiers prize money is also the Round of 32 prize money.
*per team

Singles main draw entrants

Seeds 

1 Rankings as of 22 February 2021.

Other entrants 
The following players received wildcards into the main draw: 
  Eugenie Bouchard
  Clara Burel
  Harmony Tan

The following players received entry into the main draw using a protected ranking:
  Mihaela Buzărnescu
  Vera Lapko

The following players received entry from the qualifying draw:
  Magdalena Fręch
  Margarita Gasparyan
  Giulia Gatto-Monticone
    Viktorija Golubic
  Tereza Martincová
  Clara Tauson

Withdrawals 
Before the tournament
  Zarina Diyas → replaced by  Katarzyna Kawa
  Kirsten Flipkens → replaced by    Stefanie Vögele
  Coco Gauff → replaced by  Irina Bara
  Kaja Juvan → replaced by  Katarina Zavatska
  Marta Kostyuk → replaced by  Greet Minnen
  Kateryna Kozlova → replaced by  Océane Dodin
  Nadia Podoroska → replaced by  Wang Xiyu

Doubles main draw entrants

Seeds 

 Rankings as of February 8, 2021.

Other entrants 
The following pairs received wildcards into the doubles main draw:
  Loïs Boisson /  Juline Fayard  
  Amandine Hesse /  Elixane Lechemia

The following pairs received entry into the doubles main draw using protected rankings:
  Vera Lapko /  Aliaksandra Sasnovich  
  Alexandra Panova /  Rosalie van der Hoek

Withdrawals  
Before the tournament
  Natela Dzalamidze /  Cornelia Lister → replaced by  Margarita Gasparyan /  Cornelia Lister

References

External links 
 Official website

2021 in French tennis
2021 WTA Tour
2021 Open (WTA)
2021
March 2021 sports events in France